Isola Rizza is a comune (municipality) in the Province of Verona in the Italian region Veneto, located about  west of Venice and about  southeast of Verona.

Isola Rizza borders the following municipalities: Bovolone, Oppeano, Ronco all'Adige, Roverchiara, and San Pietro di Morubio.

In 1873, the 6th-century Isola Rizza dish was found in a hoard near the parish church.

Ville and Palazzi 
 Villa Maffei - 15th century
 Palazzo Dogana - 15th century
 Villa Pollettini - 15th century
 Villa Mandella - 16th century
 Villa Sagramoso Buri - 16th century 
 Villa Bonanome Bellinato - 16th century
 Villa Martelli - 16th century
 Villa Ferrari - 18th century

Demographic evolution

References

External links

 www.comune-isolarizza.it/

Cities and towns in Veneto